Fiyo on the Bayou is the second studio album by the New Orleans four piece The Neville Brothers. It was released in 1981 on A&M.

The album features background vocals performed by a young Whitney Houston and her mother Cissy Houston, with soul singer/songwriter Eltesa Weathersby, on the tracks "Fire on the Bayou" and "Sitting in Limbo", with the vocal arrangements by Cissy Houston.

In 1975 another album entitled Fire On The Bayou was released by The Meters, a band that included Art Neville on keyboards. "Hey Pocky Way" is a tune heard on the Meters' album, Rejuvenation. The album has also been released by Mobile Fidelity Sound Lab as an Ultradisc gold CD in 1994.

Track listing
"Hey Pocky Way" (Ziggy Modeliste, Art Neville, Leo Nocentelli, George Porter, Jr.) - 4:14
"Sweet Honey Dripper" (Neville) - 5:19
"Fire on the Bayou" (Modeliste, Neville, Nocentelli, Porter) - 5:16
"Ten Commandments of Love" (Marshall Paul) - 3:45
"Sitting in Limbo" (Guilly Bright, Jimmy Cliff) - 4:11
"Brother John / Iko Iko"  (King, Neville) - 5:34
"Mona Lisa" (Jay Livingston, Ray Evans) - 3:45
"Run Joe" - 3:36

Personnel
Art Neville - vocals, keyboards
Cyril Neville - vocals, keyboards, percussion
Charles Neville - saxophone, percussion, vocals
Aaron Neville - vocals, percussion
Charmaine Neville - vocals
Babi Floyd - backing vocals
Carl Blouin - baritone saxophone
Cissy Houston - backing vocals
David Newman - saxophone
David Barard - bass guitar
Eltesa Weathersby - backing vocals
Herbert Rhoad - backing vocals
Herman V. Ernest III - drums
Ivan Neville - percussion
James Hayes - backing vocals
Jayotis Washington - backing vocals
Jerry Lawson - backing vocals
Jim Weber - trumpet
Jimmy Duggan - trombone
Joe Russell - backing vocals
Joseph Fox III - trumpet
Kenneth Williams - percussion
Leo Nocentelli - guitars
Mac Rebennack - percussion, keyboards
The Persuasions - backing vocals
Quay Houchen - backing vocals
Ralph MacDonald - percussion
Wardell Quezergue - synthesizer, acoustic piano
Whitney Houston - backing vocals
Zachary Sanders - backing vocals

References

1981 albums
A&M Records albums
Albums produced by Joel Dorn
The Neville Brothers albums
Albums recorded at Studio in the Country